Robert Geering Burns (February 7, 1921 – November 6, 2000) was an American football player and coach. He served as the head football coach at Augustana College—now known as Augustana University—in Sioux Falls, South Dakota from 1956 to 1961 and the University of South Dakota in 1962, compiling a career college football coaching record of 29–29–2. He died in November 2000 at the age of 80.

Head coaching record

References

External links
 South Dakota Hall of Fame

1921 births
2000 deaths
American football fullbacks
American football quarterbacks
Augustana (South Dakota) Vikings football coaches
South Dakota Coyotes football coaches
South Dakota Coyotes football players
High school football coaches in South Dakota
Sportspeople from Sioux City, Iowa
Players of American football from Iowa